Alfred Ellis Gross, Jr. (born January 4, 1961) is a former professional American football safety in the National Football League (NFL) for the Cleveland Browns. He played college football at the University of Arizona.

Early years
Gross attended Franklin High School, where he was a two-time All-conference selection in both football and basketball. He earned All-state honors in basketball as a senior.

He accepted a football scholarship from the University of Arizona. He became a starter at strong safety as a sophomore and went on to play in 33 straight games. He was known as a hard-hitting player that excelled in big games. He had 4 career interceptions.

Professional career

Dallas Cowboys
Gross was selected in the ninth round (246th overall) of the 1983 NFL Draft by the Dallas Cowboys. He was also selected by the Arizona Wranglers in the 1983 USFL Territorial Draft. At his request, he was released very early in training camp (August 1).

Cleveland Browns
He was claimed off waivers by the Cleveland Browns 2 days later. His early contributions came playing on special teams and backing up both safety positions.

In 1984, he was named the starter at strong safety and was part of a secondary that earned the nickname "Dawgs", while helping the defensive unit to finish second overall in the NFL. He led the team two years in a row (1984 and 1985) with 5 interceptions.

On September 9, 1986, he was placed on the injured reserve list with a knee injury.

In 1987, he started the first four games of the season at free safety, before experiencing complications from a knee injury he suffered the year before. He lost his starting position to Felix Wright and was placed on the inactive list during the last 4 games of the regular season and the playoffs.

On August 4, 1988, he requested to be released from the Browns roster, after feeling he wasn't getting much work in training camp. He finished his career with 261 tackles, 11 interceptions, 6 fumble recoveries and 2 touchdowns.

References

External links
Gross is key leader for browns defense 
 Browns picking off passes for Africa's starving people

1961 births
Living people
Players of American football from Stockton, California
American football safeties
Arizona Wildcats football players
Cleveland Browns players